Patricia Carola Velásquez Semprún (born 31 January 1971) is a Venezuelan actress and model. As an actress, she is known for her portrayal of Anck-su-namun in the 1999 film The Mummy and its 2001 sequel The Mummy Returns.

Early life
Velásquez was born in Maracaibo, Venezuela, the fifth of six children. Her father is mestizo and her mother a member of the indigenous Wayuu people. Her parents were both teachers; her father also worked for UNESCO and was assigned to other countries. Velásquez grew up with her family in France and Mexico. She attended San Vicente de Paul High School, graduating in 1987.

In 1989, she participated in the Miss Venezuela 1989 contest. She represented Peninsula de la Guajira, a center of the Wayuu people, and placed as 2nd runner-up. After three years of engineering studies at college, Velásquez left for Milan, Italy, in pursuit of a modeling career. She is fluent in English, Spanish, French, and Italian.

Career
From 1995 to 2000, Velásquez studied acting in Los Angeles and New York. She paced down runways in ready-to-wear fashion shows for designers such as Chanel, Chloe, John Galliano, Antonio Berardi, Bella Freud, Corinne Cobson, Claude Montana, Dolce & Gabbana and many others. Velásquez appeared in print ads for Chanel's Allure, Cover Girl, Monsoon, Roberto Verino's Verino fragrance, as well as Victoria's Secret.

During her modeling career, she appeared on the covers of Vogue, Bazaar, and Marie Claire among others and several issues of the annual Sports Illustrated Swimsuit Issue. This led to a large number of further modeling engagements. She was ranked as No. 45 on the Maxim Hot 100 Women of 2001 and No. 16 in Stuff magazine's "102 Sexiest Women in the World" poll in 2002.

Velásquez played Meela Nais / Anck-Su-Namun in the 1999 film The Mummy and its 2001 sequel The Mummy Returns.

She had a special appearance on "Breaking the Girl" video of the alternative rock band Red Hot Chili Peppers. She also appeared on the Rod Stewart video "Leave Virginia Alone" and others, such as Ricardo Montaner "Para Llorar" and George Michael "Spinning the Wheel."

Velásquez was appointed UNESCO Artist for Peace (Goodwill Ambassador) in June 2003, in the context of the International Decade for the World’s Indigenous People. She was honored in recognition of her actions for protection of the Wayúu indigenous people in Latin America and for safeguarding their cultural heritage.

Velásquez played the character of Begoña on several episodes of The L Word during its 5th season (2008). She had a recurring role on the television series Arrested Development playing Marta Estrella. On CSI: Miami, in the episode "From the Grave", she appeared as a guest star, playing Celia Gonzalez. She had a recurring role in the first season of Rescue Me playing Nez, the ex-girlfriend and mother of Franco's daughter, Keela. She also guest starred on Ugly Betty and Hawaii Five-0 (2010 TV series, season 9) She also voiced the character Marisol Díez Delgado in the SSX franchise.

She received the “Women Together” award at the United Nations on 2009. The Awards Ceremony recognizes the valuable contribution of men, women, and institutions dedicated to the creation of a 
more equal society

Velásquez competed on behalf of the charity Wayúu Tayá Foundation on the twelfth season of The Apprentice. She was fired in week 6, on 25 March 2012.

On 2015, LA Femme Film Festival gave Velásquez their Humanitarian Award.

On August 30, 2018, the Organization of American States (OAS) appointed Velásquez as Goodwill Ambassador for the Rights of Indigenous Peoples of the Americas during a ceremony at its headquarters in Washington, DC.

Velásquez was honored by the Human Rights Campaign with the 2018 Visibility Award in New England.

In 2019, she played Patricia Alvarez in the horror film The Curse of La Llorona.

In 2020, Velásquez played Nurse Velasquez in Malignant, Mariela Vicuna in Brut Force, and Meg in List of a Lifetime where she was nominated for Best Supporting Actress in the 2022 Imagen Awards.

Personal life
In 2002, Velásquez founded The Wayuu Taya Foundation, a non-profit organization dedicated to assisting the Wayuu, an indigenous people located in northwestern Venezuela and northern Colombia. In 2010, after the devastating Haiti earthquake, she had the Wayuú Tayá Foundation commission a special symbol of hope to raise money for the victims of the Haiti earthquake. It was sold with the slogan: Keep the "H" Close to Your Heart—Help Haiti Hope.

Velásquez has a daughter, Maya, with Lauren her former girlfriend. They separated after eight years together.

In February 2015, Velásquez released her memoir Straight Walk, recalling her journey from poverty to international acclaim. She came out as lesbian, saying that she wanted to set an example of honesty for her daughter.

Filmography

Film

Television

Video games

References

External links
 
 

1971 births
Living people
Venezuelan lesbian actresses
Lesbian models
Participants in American reality television series
People from Maracaibo
The Apprentice (franchise) contestants
Venezuelan expatriates in the United States
Venezuelan female models
Venezuelan film actresses
Venezuelan people of indigenous peoples descent
Venezuelan people of Wayuu descent
Venezuelan philanthropists
Venezuelan television actresses